The Romanian Socialist Democratic Party (PSDR) was a political party in Romania. During its short existence, it was easily mistaken for Romanian Social Democratic Party.

History
The PSDR contested the 1990 general elections, receiving around 1.1% of the vote in both the Chamber and Senate elections. Although it failed to win a seat in the Senate, the party won five seats in the Chamber. The 1992 elections saw its vote share fall to 0.9%, resulting in it losing all five seats.

Electoral history

Legislative elections

References

Defunct socialist parties in Romania